Lilla Berki (born ) was a Hungarian weightlifter, competing in the 48 kg category and representing Hungary at international competitions. 

She competed at world championships, most recently at the 2010 World Weightlifting Championships.

Major results

References

External links
http://www.iwf.net/2010/08/25/the-very-first-youth-olympic-games/
http://www.alamy.com/stock-photo-hungarys-lilla-berki-in-action-during-her-clean-and-jerk-routine-37144662.html
http://www.todor66.com/weightlifting/World/2010/Women_under_48kg.html

1993 births
Living people
Hungarian female weightlifters
Place of birth missing (living people)
Weightlifters at the 2010 Summer Youth Olympics